Louis Auguste Laurent Aiguier, a French marine painter, was born at Toulon in 1819, and died in that town in 1865. There are examples of his work in the Museums of Toulon and Marseille.

References
 

19th-century French painters
French male painters
French marine artists
1819 births
1865 deaths
Artists from Toulon
19th-century French male artists